763 Cupido (prov. designation:  or ) is a Flora asteroid, tumbler and slow rotator from the inner regions of the asteroid belt, approximately  in diameter. It was discovered on 25 September 1913, by German astronomer Franz Kaiser at the Heidelberg-Königstuhl State Observatory in southwest Germany. The S/L-type asteroid has an exceptionally long rotation period of 151 hours. It was named by its Latin name after Cupid, the Roman god of erotic love, attraction and affection.

Orbit and classification 

When applying the synthetic hierarchical clustering method (HCM) by Nesvorný, or the 1995 HCM-analysis by Zappalà, Cupido is a member of the Flora family, a giant asteroid family and the largest family of stony asteroids in the main-belt. However, according to another HCM-analysis by Milani and Knežević (AstDys), it is a background asteroid as this analysis does not recognize the Flora asteroid clan. Cupido orbits the Sun in the inner asteroid belt at a distance of 1.9–2.6 AU once every 3 years and 4 months (1,226 days; semi-major axis of 2.24 AU). Its orbit has an eccentricity of 0.17 and an inclination of 4° with respect to the ecliptic. The body's observation arc begins at Yerkes Observatory  in September 1933, or 20 years after to its official discovery observation by Franz Kaiser at Heidelberg Observatory in 1913.

Naming 

This minor planet was named "Cupido", the Latin name of Cupid, god of erotic love, attraction and affection in Roman mythology whose Greek counterpart is Eros (also see asteroid 433 Eros). Cupido was named due to its relative proximity to the Sun probably by Swedish astronomer Bror Ansgar Asplind (1890–1954) who was honored by asteroid 958 Asplinda. The  was mentioned in The Names of the Minor Planets by Paul Herget in 1955.

Physical characteristics 

In the SDSS-based taxonomy, Cupido is an SL-type that transitions from the common, stony S-type asteroids to the uncommon L-type asteroids.

Rotation period 

In October 2017, a rotational lightcurve of Cupido was obtained from photometric observations by American astronomer Frederick Pilcher in collaboration with Vladimir Benishek at Belgrade Observatory and Daniel A. Klinglesmith at Etscorn Observatory . Lightcurve analysis gave a rotation period of  hours with a brightness variation of  magnitude. The observations also showed that it is a tumbling asteroid, which wobbles on its non-principal axis rotation. During the same opposition, Tom Polakis at the Command Module Observatory  also observed the asteroid and measured a period of  hours and an amplitude of  magnitude. The results supersede a tentative period determination of  hours by René Roy from 2005.

Diameter and albedo 

The Collaborative Asteroid Lightcurve Link assumes a standard albedo for a Flora asteroid of 0.20 and calculates a diameter of 8.97 kilometers based on an absolute magnitude of 12.6.

References

External links 
 Minor Planet Lightcurve Data, Frederick Pilcher
 Lightcurve Database Query (LCDB), at www.minorplanet.info
 Dictionary of Minor Planet Names, Google books
 Asteroids and comets rotation curves, CdR – Geneva Observatory, Raoul Behrend
 Discovery Circumstances: Numbered Minor Planets (1)-(5000) – Minor Planet Center
 
 

000763
Discoveries by Franz Kaiser
Named minor planets
19130925